Tumbler pigeons are varieties of domesticated pigeons that are descendants of the rock dove that have been selected for their ability to tumble or roll over backwards in flight.

This ability has been known in domesticated breeds of pigeons for centuries. In Wendell Levi's book The Pigeon, reference is made to pigeons with this tumbling ability existing in India before the year 1590. Charles Darwin, in his book The Origin of Species, makes reference to the Short-faced Tumbler which was a popular breed during his lifetime, and still can be found exhibited at pigeon shows today.

There are many different breeds that have descended from the original tumbler stocks. Some of the more popular breeds today include:
Anekal Rekdhar Tumbler
Armenian Tumbler

Australian Performing Tumbler
Australian Saddleback Tumbler
Berlin Short-faced Tumbler
Berlin Long-faced Tumbler
Budapest Short-faced Tumbler
English Long-faced Tumbler
English Short-faced Tumbler
Felégyhaza Tumbler
Indian Tumblers
Iranian Highflying Tumbler
Komorner Tumbler
Krasnodar Tumbler
Limerick Tumblers
Shiraz Tumbler
Vienna long-faced tumbler
West of England Tumbler

See also 
Roller (pigeon)
Birmingham Roller
List of pigeon breeds

References

Domestic pigeons
Pigeon breeds